The Bureau of Ghana Languages is an agency of the government of Ghana that promotes Ghanaian languages, including publication of materials in them. It focuses on 11 languages: Akuapem Twi, Asante Twi, Ewe, Mfantse, Ga, Dangme, Nzema, Dagbani, Dagaare, Gonja and Kasem.

The bureau provides services for the promotion, orthographic control and learning of Ghanaian languages, as well as  general research into Ghanaian languages, writing, translation of non-local language documents, assessment, editing and publication of documents in Ghanaian languages. It also influences government policies on Ghanaian languages through the co-ordination of all agencies involved in promoting Ghanaian languages.  It has two offices, one in Accra and the other in Tamale.

History
The bureau was founded in 1951, originally as the Vernacular Literature Bureau, and later given its current name in 1957. In 1958 it was converted into a department under the Ministry of Information. It was later transferred from the Ministry of Information to the Ministry of Education in 1963. The Bureau has since 1 December 1989 been under the National Commission on Culture by the PNDC Law 238. The Bureau of Ghana Languages is a government institution involved in the educational and cultural effort of the nation. It is a unique institution because, as a government publishing house, it is the only institution of its kind that publishes exclusively in Ghanaian languages.

References

Government of Ghana
 
Language regulators